The Empress (III) is the third trump or Major Arcana card in traditional tarot decks. It is used in card games as well as divination.

Description 
The Empress sits on a throne wearing a crown with twelve stars, holding a scepter in one hand.  The scepter is representative of her power over life, her crown has twelve stars representing her dominance over the year, and her throne is in the midst of a field of grain, representative of her dominion over growing things. The Empress is representative of the productivity of the subconscious, seeded by ideas. She is meant to be the embodiment of the growth of the natural world, fertility, and what one knows or believes from the heart.

History 
Arthur Edward Waite and the other occultists are responsible for the starry crown, the emblem of Venus, the waterfall, and the vegetation and wildlife. In historical decks, the Empress sits on a throne, almost always holding a shield or orb in one hand and a scepter in the other. The shield typically bears an eagle, the heraldic emblem of the Holy Roman Empire.

The Empress can be represented by Aphrodite, a figure from Greek mythology. The empress connects with the Death card, for she is accustomed to life, death and rebirth.

In Media
In the manga JoJo's Bizarre Adventure tarot cards are used to name the character's powers, named 'Stands' one of the Stardust Crusaders, Nena, has A stand named The Empress, named after tarot card.

In the Adventure Time miniseries Stakes, one of the members of the Vampire King's court is named after The Empress.

Interpretation 
According to Waite's 1910 book The Pictorial Key to the Tarot, The Empress is the inferior (as opposed to nature's superior) Garden of Eden, the "Earthly Paradise". Waite defines her as a  — a fruitful mother of thousands: "she is above all things universal fecundity and the outer sense of the Word, the repository of all things nurturing and sustaining, and of feeding others."

The Empress is a mother, a creator, and nurturer.  In many decks she can be shown as pregnant.  She can represent the creation of life, romance, art, or business. The Empress can represent the germination of an idea before it is ready to be fully born, and the need to be receptive to change.

The Empress is associated with the planet Venus in astrology.

Waite writes that the card carries these several divinatory associations:

3. THE EMPRESS.--Fruitfulness, action, initiative, length of days; the unknown, clandestine; also difficulty, doubt, ignorance. Reversed: Light, truth, the unraveling of involved matters, public rejoicings; according to another reading, vacillation.

Tarot-time.com defines  in part as "The message from Spirit is that the creative impulse is in all things and all people, including you, and you must not only accept that but honor it."

Alternative decks 
In the Wildwood Tarot by Mark Ryan, this card is called "The Green Woman".
In the Greenwood Tarot by Chesca Potter, this card is called "Greenwoman".
In the New Orleans Voodoo Tarot by Louis Martinie, this card is called "Ayizan".
 In the Goddess Tarot by Kris Waldherr, this card is called "III Fertility".
 In the Goddess Tarot "III Fertility" represents "The Empress is a Major Arcana card, and in the Upright position, symbolizes the supreme archetype of divine femininity. In the Advice position, the Empress encourages you to embrace this part of yourself as a way to restore balance to the masculine and feminine energies you possess."

References 

 A. E. Waite's 1910 Pictorial Key to the Tarot
 Hajo Banzhaf, Tarot and the Journey of the Hero (2000)
 Most works by Joseph Campbell
 G. Ronald Murphy, S.J., The Owl, The Raven, and The Dove: Religious Meaning of the Grimm's Magic Fairy Tales (2000)
 Riane Eisler, The Chalice and the Blade (1987)
 Mary Greer, The Women of the Golden Dawn
 Merlin Stone, When God Was A Woman
 Robert Graves, Greek Mythology
Juliette Wood (1998), Folklore 109:15–24, "The Celtic Tarot and the Secret Tradition: A Study in Modern Legend Making" (1998)

External links 

Major Arcana